Jabez Bayley (or Jabez Bailey), (1771 -1834), was an English ship builder based in Ipswich, East Anglia.

Family life
Jabez married Miss Darby in May 1813.

Merchant ships built by Jabez Bayley

Naval vessels built by Jabez Bayley

References

British shipbuilders
1771 births
1834 deaths